Hanna Oleksandrivna Plotitsyna (born 1 January 1987 in Sumy) is a Ukrainian athlete specialising in the sprint hurdles. She represented her country at the 2013 World Championships and 2014 World Indoor Championships without qualifying to the semifinals.

She has personal bests of 12.89 seconds in the 100 metres hurdles (+0.9 m/s; Kropyvnytskiy 2017) and 7.92 seconds indoors (Beograd 2017).

Competition record

References

1987 births
Living people
Ukrainian female hurdlers
World Athletics Championships athletes for Ukraine
Athletes (track and field) at the 2016 Summer Olympics
Olympic athletes of Ukraine
Athletes (track and field) at the 2019 European Games
European Games medalists in athletics
European Games gold medalists for Ukraine
European Games silver medalists for Ukraine
Ukrainian Athletics Championships winners
Competitors at the 2013 Summer Universiade
Sportspeople from Sumy
20th-century Ukrainian women
21st-century Ukrainian women